Mapai (an acronym for , Mifleget Poalei Eretz Yisrael, lit. "Workers' Party of the Land of Israel") was a democratic socialist political party in Israel, and was the dominant force in Israeli politics until its merger into the modern-day Israeli Labor Party in 1968. During Mapai's time in office, a wide range of progressive reforms were carried out, as characterised by the establishment of a welfare state, providing minimum income, security, and free (or almost free) access to housing subsidies and health and social services.

History
The party was founded on 5 January 1930 by the merger of the Hapoel Hatzair founded by A. D. Gordon and the original Ahdut HaAvoda (founded in 1919 from the right, more moderate, wing of the Zionist socialist Poale Zion led by David Ben-Gurion). In the early 1920s the Labor Zionist movement had founded the Histadrut Union, which dominated the Hebrew settlement economy and infrastructure, later making Mapai the dominant political faction in Zionist politics. It was also responsible for the founding of Hashomer and Haganah, the first two armed Jewish groups which secured the people and property of the new and emerging Jewish communities. By the early 1930s, David Ben-Gurion had taken over the party, and had become de facto leader of the Jewish community in Palestine (known as the Yishuv). It was a member of the Labour and Socialist International between 1930 and 1940.

The party was Jewish-only until the late 1960s, with a succession of satellite parties for Israeli Arabs, including the Democratic List of Nazareth, the Democratic List for Israeli Arabs, Agriculture and Development, Progress and Work, Cooperation and Brotherhood, Progress and Development and Cooperation and Development. It supported the policy of subjecting Arab citizens to martial law, which included confining them to the towns of their residence, and allowing them to exit only with a permit granted by the Israeli authorities.

Politics and government
Due to its role in emerging victorious and independent from the 1948 Arab–Israeli War, the party won large support in Israel's first elections in 1949, winning 35.7% of the vote (well ahead of second-placed Mapam's 14.7%) and 46 of the 120 seats. Ben-Gurion became Prime Minister and formed a coalition with the United Religious Front, the Progressive Party, the Sephardim and Oriental Communities and the Democratic List of Nazareth (an Israeli Arab party associated with Mapai). A notable piece of legislation enacted during Mapai's first term in office was an educational law in 1949 which introduced compulsory schooling for all children between the ages of 5 to 14. Mapai's years in office also witnessed the passage of the National Insurance Act of 1953 and the Social Welfare Service Law of 1958, which authorised a broad range of social welfare programmes, including special allowances for large families, workers' compensation provisions, maternity insurance, and old age and survivors' pensions.

In the second elections in 1951 Mapai increased its vote to 37.3% (and 47 seats) despite the country's economic problems. Ben-Gurion again formed the government with the support of Mizrachi, Hapoel HaMizrachi, Agudat Yisrael, Poalei Agudat Yisrael and the three Israeli Arab parties associated with Mapai, the Democratic List for Israeli Arabs, Progress and Work and Agriculture and Development. However, he shocked the nation by resigning on 6 December 1953 in order to settle in the small Negev kibbutz of Sde Boker, and was replaced by Moshe Sharett.

The 1955 elections saw a drop in the party's support to 32.2% (and 40 seats), though still well ahead of the second-placed Herut (12.6%). Ben Gurion returned as Prime Minister, and formed a coalition with the National Religious Front (which later changed its name to the National Religious Party), Mapam, Ahdut HaAvoda, and the three Israeli Arab parties, the Democratic List for Israeli Arabs, Progress and Work and Agriculture and Development. Later the Progressive Party was also added.

In contrast to the previous one, the 1959 election saw a surge in support, as the party recorded its best electoral performance, taking 38.2% of the vote and 47 seats. Ben-Gurion again invited the National Religious Party, Mapam, Ahdut HaAvoda, the Progressive Party and the three Israeli Arab parties, Progress and Development, Cooperation and Brotherhood and Agriculture and Development to form the coalition.

The inquiry into the Lavon Affair which brought down the government in 1961 probably contributed to the party's relatively poor performance in the elections in the same year, as it picked up only 34.7% of the vote and 42 seats. Although Ben-Gurion formed a strong coalition with the National Religious Party, Ahdut HaAvoda, Agudat Yisrael Workers, Cooperation and Brotherhood and Progress and Development, two events during the fifth Knesset led to Mapai's reducing dominance.

Firstly, Ben-Gurion resigned as head of the party citing personal reasons, though in reality he was upset at a perceived lack of support from colleagues. He set up a new party, Rafi, taking with him seven other Mapai members. Secondly, the two major right-wing opposition parties, Herut and the Liberal Party had merged into Gahal. This meant by the end of the Knesset session, Mapai had only 34 seats to Gahal's 27.

The party's response to the unprecedented strength of the opposition was to seek support from other parties with similar ideologies. The result was an alliance with Ahdut HaAvoda to form the Labor Alignment before the 1965 election. The new party won 36.7% of the vote and 45 seats, and comfortably beat Gahal (26 seats). On 23 January 1968 Mapai, Ahdut HaAvoda and Rafi merged into the Israeli Labor Party and ceased to exist as individual entities.

Party leaders

General Secretaries
 1930–1954 – David Ben-Gurion
 1954–1955 – Moshe Sharett
 1955–1963 – David Ben-Gurion
 1963–1968 – Levi Eshkol

Selection of party leaders
Until 1963, the party had no formal rules to govern the selection of its leader. From the party's establishment, David Ben-Gurion was long the unchallenged leader of the party. Even in his brief 1954–1955 retirement (during which Moshe Sharett served as the official party leader), Ben-Gurion was still largely considered the de facto party boss. After Ben-Gurion retired again in 1963, informal consultations by the party's leading figures resulted in an informal consensus to appoint Levi Eshkol as leader, and this choice was ratified by the party's Central Committee. Soon after becoming party leader, Eshkol successfully pushed the party to amend its constitution to state that the party's candidate for the office of prime minister (its leader) would be selected by the party's Central Committee. Thus, when Ben-Gurion unsuccessfully attempted to retake party leadership in 1965, there was a formal leadership election held by a vote of the party's Central Committee.

Electoral results

References

External links

Worker's Party of Eretz Yisrael (Mapai) Knesset website

Political parties in Mandatory Palestine
Political parties established in 1930
1930 establishments in Mandatory Palestine
Political parties disestablished in 1968
1968 disestablishments in Israel
Defunct political parties in Israel
Socialist parties in Israel
Zionist political parties in Israel
Members of the Labour and Socialist International
Labor Zionism
Poale Zion
Left-wing nationalist parties